Toot Baldon is a village and civil parish about  southeast of Oxford in Oxfordshire. Since 2012 it has been part of the Baldons joint parish council area, sharing a parish council with the adjacent civil parish of Marsh Baldon. The 2011 Census recorded its population as 148.

Toponym
"Toot" is derived from an Old English word for "a look-out place". "Baldon" is derived from the Old English for "Bealda's Hill".

History
The Church of England parish church of Saint Lawrence was built mostly in the 13th century. It was restored to designs by the Gothic Revival architect Henry Woodyer in 1865. The church is a Grade II* listed building. There is a monument to the 1965 Little Baldon air crash in the north aisle of the church. Court House Farm is partly 16th century. Toot Baldon manor house was built in the 17th century and is Grade II* listed. A parish school was built in the 19th or early 20th century. It has since closed and the building is now a private house.

Amenities
Toot Baldon has a pub. It used to be the Crown but is now called the Mole Inn. Toot Baldon and Marsh Baldon share a cricket club.

References

Sources

External links

Baldons Parish Council

Villages in Oxfordshire
Civil parishes in Oxfordshire
South Oxfordshire District